Maik-Kalev Kotsar (born 22 December 1996) is an Estonian professional basketball player for Saski Baskonia of the Spanish Liga ACB. He played college basketball for South Carolina Gamecocks. Kotsar also has played for the Estonia men's national basketball team as well as the Estonia men's national 3x3 team.

College career
On 7 March 2016, Kotsar committed to play for the South Carolina Gamecocks. In his freshman year, Kotsar saw action in all 37 games with 33 starts, averaging 5.8 points and 4.8 rebounds per game as South Carolina advanced to its first-ever Final Four, losing 73–77 to Gonzaga. Kotsar earned second-team All-SEC honors after averaging 11.2 points, 6.3 rebounds, 2.3 assists, 1.5 steals and 1.1 blocks per game during his senior season.

Maik Kotsar attended the University of South Carolina's Darla Moore School of Business. He majored in Finance and minored in Management. By the time of his graduation he had been named to the President's List, was on the Athletics Director's Honor Roll and had been named to the SEC Honor Roll all four years, and was named to the NABC (National Association of Basketball Coaches) Honors Court. Possibly his most notable academic achievement came his senior year when he was named University of South Carolina's Male Scholar Athlete of the Year. This award is given each year to one graduating senior with exceptional and outstanding academic achievement.

Professional career
On August 16, 2020, Kotsar signed with the Hamburg Towers of the Basketball Bundesliga. In both seasons with the Hamburg side, he averaged 14.2 points per game in Bundesliga play.

On July 25, 2022, he put pen to paper on a deal with Saski Baskonia of the Spanish Liga ACB. Kotsar recorded 21 points, 9 rebounds, 4 assists and 1 block in his EuroLeague debut in Baskonia's 81–71 victory over Valencia.

National team career
Kotsar made his debut for the Estonian national team on 29 June 2018, in a 2019 FIBA Basketball World Cup qualifier against Great Britain, scoring 8 points in a 65–74 away defeat.

3x3
Kotsar's 3x3 career started in the U18 division in 2013 with the Sprite Streetball 2013 Tallinn tournament where he advanced to the U18 Estonia Finals and eventually the 2013 FIBA 3x3 World Championships on September 26, 2013.
Kotsar continued to compete 3x3 through 2014 and 2015.
His FIBA 3x3 career returned from hiatus in 2018 Ghetto Basket Pro Camp in Riga on May 10 of that year. His team would advance all the way to the FIBA 3x3 World Cup tournament. Kotsar's Estonia Men's 3x3 team would be defeated by the Poland national 3x3 team who would themselves go on to win 3rd place in the entire tournament after being eliminated in the semifinals.
The Estonian 3x3 Men's Team's run came to an end at the preliminary stage pools at 3rd place of the 2018 FIBA 3x3 World Cup – Men's tournament and they took home 9th place.

Career statistics

Eurocup

|-
| style="text-align:left;"| 2021–22
| style="text-align:left;"| Hamburg Towers
| 16 || 6 || 26.5 || .604 || – || .667 || 6.6 || 1.4 || 1.2 || 0.2 || 13.4 || 17.2

College

|-
| style="text-align:left;"| 2016–17
| style="text-align:left;"| South Carolina
| 37 || 33 || 23.9 || .490 || – || .396 || 4.8 || .7 || .7 || .4 || 5.8
|-
| style="text-align:left;"| 2017–18
| style="text-align:left;"| South Carolina
| 33 || 33 || 26.5 || .426 || .222 || .566 || 4.8 || 1.4 || .9 || .5 || 8.0
|-
| style="text-align:left;"| 2018–19
| style="text-align:left;"| South Carolina
| 30 || 24 || 23.4 || .438 || .500 || .443 || 4.7 || .9 || 1.0 || .9 || 6.7
|-
| style="text-align:left;"| 2019–20
| style="text-align:left;"| South Carolina
| 31 || 31 || 30.5 || .497 || .000 || .690 || 6.3 || 2.3 || 1.5 || 1.1 || 11.2
|- class="sortbottom"
| style="text-align:center;" colspan="2"| Career
| 131 || 121 || 26.0 || .464 || .265 || .541 || 5.1 || 1.3 || 1.0 || .7 || 7.8

References

External links

 

South Carolina Gamecocks bio

1996 births
Living people
Centers (basketball)
Estonian expatriate basketball people in the United States
Estonian men's basketball players
Hamburg Towers players
Korvpalli Meistriliiga players
Power forwards (basketball)
South Carolina Gamecocks men's basketball players
Basketball players from Tallinn
Estonian expatriate basketball people in Germany
Estonian expatriate basketball people in Spain